Tim Čeh (born 13 March 1994) is a footballer from Slovenia who plays as a midfielder for NK Dob. He is a son of former Slovenian national player and captain Aleš Čeh.

References

External links

NZS profile 

1994 births
Living people
Footballers from Ljubljana
Slovenian footballers
Association football wingers
Slovenian PrvaLiga players
NK Olimpija Ljubljana (2005) players
NK Krško players
NK Krka players
NK Dob players
Slovenia youth international footballers